Oldřiška Marešová (born 14 October 1986 in Litoměřice) is a Czech track and field athlete who specialises in the high jump. She has competed at the 2012 Summer Olympics. She was 3rd at the 2003 European Youth Olympic Festival.

Her personal bests in the event are 1.92 metres outdoors (Olomouc 2012) and 1.92 metres indoors (Valašské Meziříčí 2015).

Competition record

References

1986 births
Living people
People from Litoměřice
Czech female high jumpers
Olympic athletes of the Czech Republic
Athletes (track and field) at the 2012 Summer Olympics
World Athletics Championships athletes for the Czech Republic
Competitors at the 2009 Summer Universiade
Competitors at the 2011 Summer Universiade
Sportspeople from the Ústí nad Labem Region